Maria Nikitochkina (born 14 June 1979) is a former competitive figure skater who represented Belarus and Ukraine. She is the 1995 Belarusian national champion and achieved her best ISU Championship result, ninth, at the 1995 World Junior Championships in Budapest. She also qualified for the free skate at the 1996 World Junior Championships in Brisbane and at two senior ISU Championships — the 1995 World Championships in Birmingham and the 1996 World Championships in Edmonton.

Competitive highlights

Programs

References 

1979 births
Belarusian female single skaters
Living people
Sportspeople from Kyiv